Franz Schelle (17 June 1929 – 23 January 2017) was a West German bobsledder who competed from the mid-1950s to the mid-1960s. He won five medals at the FIBT World Championships with one gold (Four-man: 1962), two silvers (Two-man: 1960, Four-man: 1958), and two bronzes (Four-man: 1955, 1959). Competing in two Winter Olympics, Schelle's best finish was fifth in the four-man event at Innsbruck in 1964.

References
Bobsleigh two-man world championship medalists since 1931
Bobsleigh four-man world championship medalists since 1930
Wallenchinsky, David. (1984). "Bobsled: Four-man". In The Complete Book of the Olympics: 1896-1980. New York: Penguin Books. p. 561.
Franz Schelle's obituary 

1929 births
2017 deaths
German male bobsledders
Bobsledders at the 1956 Winter Olympics
Bobsledders at the 1964 Winter Olympics
Olympic bobsledders of the United Team of Germany